Thomas Chaplin (17 April 1794 – 10 May 1863) was a British political and Army officer.

The son of Charles Chaplin, Thomas lived in Blankney in Lincolnshire.  He was appointed as a captain in the Coldstream Guards, and also became a lieutenant-colonel.  He served overseas in the Peninsular War, but was seriously injured at the Siege of San Sebastián in 1813, and receiving a pension of £50.

At the 1826 UK general election, Chaplin stood for the Conservative Party in Stamford, winning the seat, and holding it in 1830.  He was defeated in the 1831 UK general election, but regained his seat in 1832, holding it until 1838, when he resigned by accepting the Chiltern Hundreds.  Unusually for a Conservative, he supported the replacement of the Assessed Taxes by a property tax.

References

1794 births
1863 deaths
Coldstream Guards officers
Conservative Party (UK) MPs for English constituencies
People from Lincolnshire
UK MPs 1826–1830
UK MPs 1830–1831
UK MPs 1832–1835
UK MPs 1835–1837
UK MPs 1837–1841